Joseph Brendan Sharkey (born March 18, 1962) is an American lawyer and politician. He is the former Speaker of the Connecticut House of Representatives.  He was sworn in as Speaker on January 9, 2013. From 2011 until his election as Speaker he served as the Majority Leader. From 2001 to 2017, he represented the 88th Assembly District, consisting of parts of Hamden.

Early life and family 
Sharkey was born in Orange, New Jersey in 1962 and moved to Connecticut in 1971.  He attended Georgetown University in Washington, D.C., graduating in 1984 with a Bachelor of Arts in English/Philosophy. He graduated from the University of Connecticut School of Law in 1989.

Professional career 
Sharkey is an attorney and owner of AmeriZone, LLC, a small consulting business specializing in zoning and permit expediting for national companies.

Political career 
Sharkey was first elected to the House in 2000 representing the 103rd Assembly District covering a part of Hamden.  He was redistricted into the 88th District in 2002. In 2011, he was elected the Majority Leader and elected Speaker in 2013.

He previously served as House Chair of the Planning & Development Committee and the Review & Investigations Committee and served on the Finance, Revenue & Bonding Committee.

Associations 
 Member, Hamden Chamber of Commerce
 Member, Connecticut Bar Association

Electoral history

External links

Biography

References

1962 births
Connecticut lawyers
Georgetown College (Georgetown University) alumni
Living people
Speakers of the Connecticut House of Representatives
Democratic Party members of the Connecticut House of Representatives
People from Hamden, Connecticut
People from Orange, New Jersey
University of Connecticut School of Law alumni
21st-century American politicians